Lamb Hotel is a Grade II listed public house at 33 Regent Street, Eccles, Salford M30 0BP.

It is on the Campaign for Real Ale's National Inventory of Historic Pub Interiors.

It was built in 1906 by Mr Newton of the architects Hartley, Hacking & Co, for Holt's Brewery.

References

Grade II listed pubs in Greater Manchester
National Inventory Pubs
Grade II listed buildings in the City of Salford
Eccles, Greater Manchester